8 DAYS is a Singaporean online magazine published by Mediacorp. Published in print weekly from 1990 to 2018, it covers a wide range of topics including entertainment, food, movies, TV, music, fashion, beauty, travel and lifestyle. It is mainly read by young people, but has an audience that spans all age groups. The magazine is known for its tongue-in-cheek humour and its coverage of the Singapore entertainment scene, and also features regional and international entertainment stories and celebrity features, such as interviews with Hollywood, Hong Kong, Taiwanese and Korean stars.

There is usually a main feature story, which often has an interview with a celeb and photos. The main sections of the magazine include “See & Do”, which has celebrity news and gossip, “Movies”, which contains reviews and film features, and “Eat & Drink”, a large food section with reviews, new openings and recipes. Other sections include “Lifestyle”, “Travel”, "Home Matters “The Feelgood Page”, “What They Never Taught You In School” and “Shirtless Guy Of The Week.”

The stars who have been featured on the covers of the magazine range from Singaporean artistes such as Zoe Tay, Rebecca Lim, Joanne Peh, Elvin Ng and Tay Ping Hui, and Singapore personalities like Joseph Schooling, to regional and Hollywood stars such as Angelina Jolie, Scarlett Johansson, Ryan Gosling and Johnny Depp.

Celebrity interviews are sometimes themed, or presented in an unusual fashion. For example, an interview with actress Shu Qi was peppered with photographs of her facial expressions when she was answering questions. Another issue had local blogger Xiaxue Photoshop her own photos. There are also annual themed issues such as "30 Sexy Stars Under 30", the "Swimsuit Issue" and the oversized "Big Issue", the first of which featured Peter Jackson's King Kong (2005 film). International blockbusters are also often featured as cover stories, with exclusive interviews with the cast of movies such as Superman Returns, Spider-Man 3 and X-Men: Days of Future Past.

History 
8Days is one of Singapore's longest-running magazines, in print for more than 28 years as of 2018.

The magazine started out as an A4-sized publication, but was changed to become a B4-sized one instead in 2008.

On 13 December 2009, the 1000th issue of 8Days was launched at Iluma. There was also an exhibit of the 999 different covers.

In 2013 and 2016, the magazine was named Magazine of the Year in a poll by trade journal, Marketing magazine. The publication was also named Entertainment and Lifestyle Magazine of the Year in 2013 for the second year running.

Since September 2018,  8Days ceased its print editions and moved to become digital-only.

References

External links
 Official website

1990 establishments in Singapore
2018 disestablishments in Singapore
Celebrity magazines
Defunct magazines published in Singapore
Entertainment magazines
Magazines established in 1990
Magazines disestablished in 2018
Mediacorp
Online magazines with defunct print editions
Magazines published in Singapore
Television magazines
Weekly magazines